Lushan Temple, is a Buddhist temple at Yuelu Mountain, Changsha, Hunan, China. It includes the Entrance, Hall of Great Heroes, Zazen room, and dining room, etc.

History

Jin dynasty
In 268, in the fourth year of the Taishi era of Emperor Wu of Jin, Zhu Fachong built the Hui Guangming Temple. It was the first temple in Hunan. After Zhu Fachong, the eminent monks Fadao and Famin served as Abbot.

Sui dynasty
In 589, in the ninth year of the Kaihuang era of Emperor Wen of Sui, Zhiyi came to Hui Guangming Temple, explained the Lotus Sutra and taught Buddhism. In 602, he built a pagoda to preserve śarīra (relics) of the Buddha.

Tang dynasty
In the early Tang dynasty, the monk renamed it Lushan Temple.Shenhui's disciple Mohe Yanna came to Lushan Temple to advertise Folk Buddhism.

In 845, after the Great Anti-Buddhist Persecution, Lushan Temple was broken down.

In 847, in the first year of the age of Dazhong of Emperor Xuanzong, Jingcen rebuilt temple and named it Luyuan.Men of letters and poets came to here to chant poems and paint pictures.

Yuan dynasty
In Yuan dynasty, Lushan Temple was broken down by Mongolian Army, it abandoned in one handred and fifty years.

Ming dynasty
In the period of the Chenghua Emperor, the monks and the government rebuilt Lushan Temple.

In the period of the Wanli Emperor, Miaoguang rebuilt a main hall, a Buddhism goddess Guanyin hall and the depositary of Buddhist texts. The Wanli Emperor renamed it Wanshou Temple.

In the late Ming dynasty, Hanshan Deqing came to Wanshou Temple to advertise Folk Buddhism.

In 1643, in the sixteenth year of the age of the Chongzhen Emperor, Wanshou Temple was broken down by the Qing army.

Qing dynasty
In 1658, in the fifteenth year of the age of the Shunzhi Emperor, the abbots Zhitan, Wenxing and the government rebuilt Wanshou Temple. Monk poets Zhitan, Wenxing, Misong, Tianfang and Liyun lived in here.

Republic of China
In the early Republic of China, the monks renamed the temple Old Lushan Temple.During the Second Sino-Japanese War, Gu Lushan Temple was bombed by a Japanese plane.

People's Republic of China
In 1966, in the Cultural Revolution, only seven monks lived in Lushan temple.

In 1983, the People's Government of Changsha rebuilt it. It was listed as a China's most important temple in the buddhism of Han areas.

In 2013, Lushan Temple was free and open to the public from May 10.

References

Buddhist temples in Changsha
Temple
3rd-century establishments in China
3rd-century Buddhist temples